Khabirov (Bashkir or Tatar: Хәбиров; Russian: Хабиров) is a Tatar and Bashkir masculine surname; its feminine counterpart is Khabirova. The surname may refer to
Radiy Khabirov (born 1964), Russian politician
Svetlana Khabirova (born 1978), Russian weightlifter

Tatar-language surnames
Bashkir-language surnames